Acroyali may refer to:

 "Acroyali", a song by Yanni on his 1987 album Out of Silence
 Acroyali, a small village by the sea near Kalamata, Greece; the birthplace of Yanni